The Hague City Hall is the city hall of The Hague, Netherlands.

History 
The city hall was designed in 1986 by the American architect Richard Meier and completed in 1995.

Architecture 
It is located in the new city centre, and incorporates the council chamber, the main public library, as well as cafés, exhibition spaces, and a wedding room. At its centre is a large atrium, flanked by two large slab buildings 10- and 12-storey tall. The library is located at the northwestern end of the building complex in a semicircular building.

It is nicknamed "the Ice Palace" for its white color.

In media 
In the 2004 American film Ocean's Twelve directed by Steven Soderbergh, it serves as the headquarters of Europol.

See also
 Old City Hall (The Hague)
 San Jose City Hall, another city hall by Meier

References

External links

Official website

City and town halls in the Netherlands
Buildings and structures in The Hague
Richard Meier buildings
Government buildings completed in 1995